This is a list of TV episodes for the Discovery Channel Canada reality TV series Highway Thru Hell.

Series Overview

Episodes

Season 1 (2012)

Season 2 (2013)

Season 3 (2014)

Season 4 (2015)

Season 5 (2016)

Season 6 (2017)

Season 7 (2018)

Season 8 (2019-20)

Season 9 (2020-21)

Season 10 (2021-22)

Season 11 (2022-23)

References 

Highway Thru Hell